Marco Meneschincheri (born 25 April 1972) is a former professional tennis player from Italy.

Biography

Career
Born in Rome, Meneschincheri began playing tennis professionally in 1990.

He played mostly on the Challenger circuit and won a title in the Uruguayan city of Punta del Este in 1997, despite suffering an injury scare earlier in the tournament in an unusual incident. During his second round encounter against Cecil Mamiit, the Italian was hit in the head by a billboard which had blown towards him and was forced to go to hospital after losing consciousness. The match was suspended but later resumed after he was given the all clear.

In 1998 he reached his highest career ranking, 131 in the world.

His ATP Tour main draw appearances include two top-tier (now known as Masters) tournaments in 1999, the German Open in Hamburg and Italian Open, making the second round of the former.

He is now involved with Italian television channel SuperTennis, for which he contributes as a commentator.

Personal life
Meneschincheri holds a degree in political science from the University of Rome.

With wife Roberta he has a son who was born in 2014. He has two brothers who are both doctors, including former professional tennis player Famiano.

ATP Challenger and ITF Futures finals

Singles: 3 (1–2)

Performance timeline

Singles

References

External links
 
 

1972 births
Living people
Italian male tennis players
Italian sports commentators
Tennis commentators
Tennis players from Rome
Sapienza University of Rome alumni